Eldridge Everett Mayweather (November 26, 1909 – February 19, 1966) was an American Negro league first baseman between 1935 and 1942.

Biography
A native of Shreveport, Louisiana, Mayweather made his Negro leagues debut in 1935 with the Kansas City Monarchs, and played with the Monarchs through 1938. He spent the following three seasons with the St. Louis–New Orleans Stars, and finished his career in 1942 with the New York Black Yankees. Mayweather was selected to play in the East–West All-Star Game in 1937 and 1940. He died in Kansas City, Missouri in 1966 at age 56.

References

External links
 and Seamheads

1909 births
1966 deaths
Kansas City Monarchs players
St. Louis–New Orleans Stars players
New York Black Yankees players
St. Louis Stars (1939) players
Baseball first basemen
Baseball players from Shreveport, Louisiana
20th-century African-American sportspeople